The Cape May Historic District is an area of  with over 600 buildings in the resort town of Cape May, Cape May County, New Jersey.  The city claims to be America's first seaside resort and has numerous buildings in the Late Victorian style, including the Eclectic, Stick, and Shingle styles, as well as the later Bungalow style, many with gingerbread trim. According to National Park Service architectural historian Carolyn Pitts, "Cape May has one of the largest collections of late 19th  century frame buildings  left in the United States... that give it a homogeneous architectural character, a kind of textbook of vernacular American building."

Geography

The City of Cape May sits at the south end of Cape May Peninsula which divides the Atlantic Ocean from the Delaware Bay.  Cape May Point, about two miles west of the City of Cape May, borders the Bay, while Cape May City borders the Ocean. Cape Island Creek, a tidal "creek" and marsh, originally divided the site of the city from the rest of Cape May, but its southern end has long been covered with landfill. The Cape May Canal, built in 1942, now divides both Cape May City and Cape May Point from the rest of the peninsula.

History of Cape May
Cape May was first discovered by Europeans by Henry Hudson on August 28, 1609.  He landed on the shore of Delaware Bay a few miles north of Cape May Point before returning to the Atlantic Ocean.
Cornelius Mey explored the area further in 1621 for the Dutch West India Company and by May, 1630 Samuel Godyn and Samuel Blommaert bought land for the Dutch from Native Americans covering the southern four miles of the Cape.
In 1632 the Dutch established a fishing and whaling settlement in the area, but by 1638 colonists from New England had moved in.  By the 1660s the English gained control and Daniel Coxe, a London Quaker, organized a government in 1687.
Early settlers worked in the lumber, shipbuilding, whaling, fishing and shellfish industries. A road along the coast built in 1796 helped establish the hamlet of Cape May.

The early emergence of Cape May as a summer resort was due to easy transport by water from Philadelphia to the Atlantic Ocean. Early Cape May vacationers were carried to the town on sloops from Philadelphia, and water transport was also easy from New York, Baltimore, Washington, D.C. and points south. Southerners later became a large proportion of summer vacationers. The resort business in Cape May began to thrive when regular steamboat traffic on the Delaware River began after the War of 1812, carrying passengers from Philadelphia and New Castle, Delaware.  Commodore Stephen Decatur made his summer home at the Atlantic Hotel about this time. The predecessor of the Congress Hall Hotel was opened in 1816 by Thomas Hughes. It took its current name in 1828, when Hughes was elected to Congress. In 1830 a visitor wrote that

Early visitors included Henry Clay in 1847, and possibly Abraham Lincoln in 1849. Serving Presidents who visited included Franklin Pierce (1855), James Buchanan (1858), Ulysses Grant (1873), Chester Arthur (1883), and Benjamin Harrison (1889). Harrison made Congress Hall his Summer White House. From the 1850s through the 1880s up to 3,000 visitors arrived each day during the summer season. Newport, Rhode Island, Saratoga Springs, New York and Long Branch, New Jersey were the town's main rivals in the summer resort business, as Cape May's reputation rose and fell with the whims of fashion.

During the 1850s summer cottages were first built and the construction of large hotels continued. Thomas U. Walter, the Architect of the Capitol, designed an addition to the Columbia Hotel. The Mount Vernon Hotel, which was designed to be the largest hotel in the world burned down in 1856, however, before its completion. Competition from Atlantic City appeared in 1854 with the construction of the Camden and Atlantic Railroad. Cape May was not connected to Philadelphia by rail until the completion of the Cape May & Millville Railroad in the mid-1860s.

Architect Stephen Decatur Button began designing buildings in Cape May in 1863 when he remodeled and expanded the Columbia Hotel. During the next thirty years he designed over forty buildings in the town. His best known buildings there include the John McCreary House (1869–70), Jackson's Clubhouse (1872), the Stockton Cottages (1872), the Windsor Hotel (1879) and the Atlantic Terrace Houses (1891–92). Plans for the George Allen House are believed to have been taken from a pattern book by Samuel Sloan. Architect Frank Furness is believed to have designed the Emlen Physick Estate, but may have otherwise visited Cape May only as a vacationer. Otherwise most of the buildings were built and designed by local builders in the vernacular style, borrowing from older buildings, pattern books and fashionable architects alike.

Several fires destroyed portions of the town and the mostly wooden, frame-built houses. The fire of 1878 destroyed about half the town, but many buildings were quickly rebuilt. This fire gave a particular boost to Button's career, and many of the local builders appear to have copied Button's style at this time. These newer buildings were built with gingerbread trim, gables and turrets.

From about 1900-1920 larger bungalows and mansions were built, especially on Beach Avenue on the eastern end of town.  Having lost its transportation advantage with the coming of the railroad and the automobile, Cape May fell out of fashion as a popular resort.  Atlantic City became the popular New Jersey beach resort in the 1920s and in the 1950s and 1960s the automobile-oriented Wildwoods, just north of Cape May, became a strong competitor, with its own distinctive architecture.

The district was added to the National Register of Historic Places in 1970, and then listed as a National Historic Landmark District in 1976.  The NRHP nomination form does not include an inventory of the buildings in the district, but rather refers to about 20 buildings that were documented by drawings or photographs by the Historic American Buildings Survey (HABS).  HABS now lists about 70 buildings in the district.

Architectural historians George E. Thomas and Carl Doebley list 100 significant buildings in their 1976 book Cape May, Queen of the Seaside Resorts: Its History and Architecture.

Selected contributing properties
Contributing properties in the district include the following. Construction dates may be approximate. T&D reference gives the reference number from George E. Thomas and Carl Doebley's book with Roman numerals indicating the more significant buildings, and Arabic numerals the less significant buildings.  Both lists are ordered by approximate date of construction.  HABS reference links to the building's page in the Historic American Buildings Survey at the Library of Congress.

See also

 National Register of Historic Places listings in Cape May County, New Jersey
 Victorian architecture
 Wildwoods Shore Resort Historic District

References

Sources

External links

Touring Historic Cape May, accessed 2010-06-28

Geography of Cape May County, New Jersey
National Historic Landmarks in New Jersey
Historic districts on the National Register of Historic Places in New Jersey
Cape May, New Jersey
Tourist attractions in Cape May County, New Jersey
National Register of Historic Places in Cape May County, New Jersey
Articles containing video clips
New Jersey Register of Historic Places